Charles George Strutton (born 17 April 1989) is an English professional footballer who plays as a striker.

Career

Non–League Career
Strutton came through the youth system of Chalfont St Peter and was moved up to the first team squad at the age of 17 in 2006, where he remained until 2012. Strutton proved to be a prolific goal scorer for the club, scoring 14 league goals in 29 appearances in 2007–08. The following season, he improved his tally, scoring 25 goals in 32 appearances for "The Saints" during the 2008–09 season. Strutton scored 42 league goals in 64 appearances between 2010–12.

AFC Wimbledon
On 2 March 2012 it was announced that Strutton had signed a short–term contract with AFC Wimbledon. The striker was immediately loaned out to Maidenhead United on the same day. He scored his only goal of the loan spell against Woking in a 2–0 win for "The Magpies" on 3 March 2012 before suffering an ankle injury which prevented him playing for the rest of the season. After remaining on trial with AFC Wimbledon for the duration of the pre–season, he was rewarded with a permanent move to "The Dons" on 13 August 2012. Strutton made his football league debut for "The Dons" on 18 September 2012 as a second-half substitute for Warren Cummings in a 1–0 defeat to Torquay United. Strutton scored his first goal for "The Dons" on 3 November 2012 in the First Round of the FA Cup, earning a 1–1 draw and a replay with York City. He also proved indispensable to "The Dons" in the reply at Kingsmeadow, scoring two of the four goals in a victory which allowed AFC Wimbledon to progress to the Second Round of the FA Cup. The 24-year–old striker signed a new two–year contract with AFC Wimbledon on 20 May 2013. He failed to get much game time for The Dons in the opening stage of the season and soon found himself loaned out to Conference National side Braintree Town on an initial one-month loan deal. He scored his first goal on 28 September 2013 in a 3–1 win over Alfreton Town. Strutton scored twice in a 3–0 win over Hyde on 5 October 2013. After scoring 20 goals in 18 games for Braintree, Strutton returned to the Dons shortly before joining Aldershot Town on a one-month emergency loan deal on 22 November 2013. However, Strutton suffered a fractured fibula and a slight displacement of the ankle joint during his Aldershot debut against Southport. He returned from loan immediately, with Wimbledon physio Stuart Douglas
stating that it would be wrong to predict a timeframe for his return. Then he signed for Braintree Town and had loans spells at Maidenhead United, Hayes & Yeading United and Slough Town. Strutton joined Maidenhead permanently in summer 2016, but made only one appearance and returned to Chalfont on loan.

Honours
Chalfont St Peter
Spartan South Midlands League Champions: 2010–11

References

External links
Charlie Strutton career stats at Soccerbase

1989 births
Living people
Footballers from the London Borough of Brent
English footballers
Association football forwards
Chalfont St Peter A.F.C. players
AFC Wimbledon players
Maidenhead United F.C. players
Aldershot Town F.C. players
Braintree Town F.C. players
Hayes & Yeading United F.C. players
Slough Town F.C. players
English Football League players
National League (English football) players
Southern Football League players